Emticicia oligotrophica  is a bacterium from the genus of Emticicia which has been isolated from warm spring water from Jorhat in India.

References

External links
Type strain of Emticicia oligotrophica at BacDive -  the Bacterial Diversity Metadatabase	

Cytophagia
Bacteria described in 2006